The 1989 Pan American Men's Handball Championship was the fifth  edition of the tournament, held in Pinar del Rio, Cuba from 24 to 30 October 1989. It acted as the American qualifying tournament for the 1990 World Championship, where the top placed team qualied.

Standings

Results
All times are local (UTC−5).

External links
Results on todor66.com

Pan American Men's Handball Championship
Pan American Men's Championship
Pan American Men's Handball Championship
International handball competitions hosted by Cuba
Pan American Men's Handball Championship